The Kovik River (French: Rivière Kovik) is a river on the Arctic tundra in Nunavik, Quebec, Canada. In some maps and publications name of the river is spelled Kovic.

Course

Culture
The river is connected with story about Aukkautik. After his son was accidentally killed on a hunting trip, Aukkautik went on a killing rampage. Eventually, he was stabbed to death by another Inuk, before he could cause further pain.

Tributaries
Durouvray River
Derville River

References

Rivers of Nord-du-Québec
Tributaries of Hudson Bay
Nunavik